Mesac William Goulburn "Goldie" Thomas (30 April 1885 – 30 December 1972) was an Australian cricketer. He played two first-class matches for New South Wales in 1909/10.

See also
 List of New South Wales representative cricketers

References

1885 births
1972 deaths
Australian cricketers
New South Wales cricketers